Asterivora oleariae is a species of moth in the family Choreutidae. It is endemic to New Zealand and can be found on Stewart Island, Big South Cape Island and The Snares. There is one generation a year on The Snares with adults being on the wing in January and February. Larvae are feed on plants in the Olearia genus.

Taxonomy
This species was first described by J. S. Dugdale in 1979 using specimens collected by Donald S. Horning and named Asterivora oleariae. In 1988 Dugdale confirmed this placement. The male holotype specimen, collected at the Snares Islands, is held at the New Zealand Arthropod Collection.

Description
Dugdale described this species as follows:

The pupa of this species is black in colour.

Distribution 
This species is endemic to New Zealand but has been collected in The Snares, Stewart Island and Big South Cape Island.

Life cycle
There is one generation per year on The Snares. Adults are on the wing in January and February. It has been hypothesised that the larval development coincides with the leaf development of its host plants.

Hosts

The larvae feed on plants in the genus Olearia including  Olearia colensoi, Olearia lyalli and Olearia angustifolia.

References

Asterivora
Moths of New Zealand
Endemic fauna of New Zealand
Moths described in 1979
Taxa named by John Stewart Dugdale